Matic Podlipnik (born 9 August 1992) is a Slovenian professional ice hockey defenseman who is currently playing for HK Poprad of the Slovak Extraliga.

Career
He played for EV Landshut of DEL2 and in the EBEL with Slovenian club, HDD Olimpija Ljubljana. On August 31, 2015, Podlipnik opted to continue in the EBEL in signing an initial one-month contract on trial with Italian club, HCB South Tyrol playing in 18 games for 2 assists, before returning to the Czech Republic.

On January 6, 2014, Podlipnik was named to Team Slovenia's official 2014 Winter Olympics roster.

Career statistics

Regular season and playoffs

International

References

External links
 

1992 births
Living people
Bolzano HC players
HC Dukla Jihlava players
SK Horácká Slavia Třebíč players
HC Karlovy Vary players
EV Landshut players
LHC Les Lions players
HDD Olimpija Ljubljana players
HC Slovan Bratislava players
Slovenian ice hockey defencemen
Sportspeople from Jesenice, Jesenice
Olympic ice hockey players of Slovenia
Ice hockey players at the 2014 Winter Olympics
Ice hockey players at the 2018 Winter Olympics
HK Spišská Nová Ves players
Hockey Club de Cergy-Pontoise players
EHC Bayreuth players
HK Poprad players
Slovenian expatriate ice hockey people
Slovenian expatriate sportspeople in the Czech Republic
Slovenian expatriate sportspeople in Austria
Slovenian expatriate sportspeople in Italy
Slovenian expatriate sportspeople in France
Slovenian expatriate sportspeople in Slovakia
Slovenian expatriate sportspeople in Germany
Slovenian expatriate sportspeople in Romania
Expatriate ice hockey players in the Czech Republic
Expatriate ice hockey players in Austria
Expatriate ice hockey players in Italy
Expatriate ice hockey players in France
Expatriate ice hockey players in Slovakia
Expatriate ice hockey players in Germany
Expatriate ice hockey players in Romania